Gohana is a city and a municipal council, near Sonipat city in the Sonipat district of the Indian state of Haryana.

Geography
Its topography consists mainly of low plains, but its south-central area has a small plateau. Gohana's 43 km2 (27.95sq mile) land area has an average elevation of 225 metres (738 feet).

Demographics

Gohana city is situated in the Sonipat district of Haryana. It is the main subdivision with a population of more than 300,000 (as of 2011). It has its own municipality and a constituency for Haryana Vidhan Sabha. There are around 86 Villages in Gohana. It is located in the west of the Sonipat District, 40 km from the town of Sonipat. Earlier, it was part of Rohtak district. Gohana is the oldest tehsil of Haryana. It was declared a tehsil in 1826 by the British, and some structures which show evidence of that time are still standing in the city: the City police station, Government Boys' Senior Secondary School, Government Girls' Senior Secondary School, and the Jain Senior Secondary School are some examples. Gohana City has its own Courts and Mini Secretariat, situated on Sonipat Road, in the eastern part of the city. "Nagar Parishad Gohana" is the governing body of the city.

It is famous for jumbo-sized Maturam Jalebis since British Era. Each jalebi generally weighs 250 grams and is made from Desi Ghee.

In ancient times, Gohana was known as Gavambhavana and was considered a sacred place. Prithviraj Chauhan constructed a fort here, which was later destroyed by Muhammad Ghori after betraying Maharaja Prithviraj Chauhan in 1192. Later, in 1947, all Muslim families left this place and migrated to Pakistan. 
Being a tehsil city, people from diverse communities reside in the city.

 India census, Gohana had a population of 121,637. Males constitute 53% of the population and females 47%. Gohana has an average literacy rate of 78%, higher than the national average of 74.5%: male literacy is 89%, and female literacy is 65%.

Religion

City

Tehsil

Traveling and distance from major cities nearby
Gohana is well connected with major districts and other small towns and villages. There is a national highway NH 71-A that connects Gohana to Rohtak and Panipat - two major districts, and National highway NH 352-A that connects it to district Sonipat and Jind. Trains connect Gohana with Rohtak, Bhiwani and Panipat. New railway line from Jind to Sonipat through Gohana is fully functional since 26 June 2016. City's railway station which was founded in early 70s is a Junction since 2012.

Distance from major cities

Politics 
The region has its own seat in Vidhan Sabha, and it comes under Sonipat in the Lok Sabha constituency. The politics of Gohana mostly revolves around caste politics. Jagbir Singh Malik has been the three time winning member of Vidhan Sabha from Indian National Congress and their member of Parliament is Ramesh Kaushik from the Bhartiya Janta Party.
The current chairperson of Gohana is Rajni Inderjeet Virmani.

Famous politicians of Gohana 

 Ram Chander Jangra
 Jagbir Singh Malik
 Rajni Inderjeet Virmani
 Kishan Singh Sangwan - Three time M.P. of Sonipat constituency.

Famous Personalities
 Subedar Chhotu Ram Sheoran - Military Cross.
 Devak Ram Surah Advocate (1904-1998)- L.L.B. Ramjas College, Delhi & B.A. D.A.V. College, Lahore.He was from Jagsi (village under Gohana tehsil). He was Divisional Panchayat officer, Haryana and Punjab Head officer, Ambala and Chairman consumer Cooperative board of Haryana state, Chandigarh. He participated in Indian freedom movement.  He was a public servant fighting for Kisans and the schedule castes. He was also a lawyer for Gohana Magistrate Court, practice lawyer Advocate Bar association courts Rohtak, Panipat, Sonipat, Chandigarh, Haryana, Punjab and Delhi.
 Yogeshwar Dutt - International Wrestler from Bhainswal Kalan, village near Gohana.

References

External links
 Ram Sharnam Ashram

Cities and towns in Sonipat district